The Pashii class (パシイ) locomotives were a group of steam tender locomotives of the Chosen Government Railway (Sentetsu) with 4-6-2 wheel arrangement. The "Pashi" name came from the American naming system for steam locomotives, under which locomotives with 4-6-2 wheel arrangement were called "Pacific".

In all, Sentetsu owned 144 locomotives of all Pashi classes, of which 141 survived the war; of these, 73 went to the Korean National Railroad in South Korea and 68 to the Korean State Railway in North Korea.

Description
As the 1920s approached, it became clear that Sentetsu needed more powerful locomotives than its existing Amei-class and the five classes of Teho-type locomotives then in service to pull its important passenger trains. Consequently, Sentetsu turned to the Baldwin Locomotive Works once again, this time ordering passenger steam locomotives of the 4-6-2 wheel arrangement.

The first locomotives with a 4-6-2 wheel arrangement to operate on Korean rails was Sentetsu's パシイ (Pashii) class. This was a group of twelve locomotives built by Baldwin in the United States and delivered to Korea in 1921. They had a steel underframe, a hard link type front bogie and a spring type rear bogie, a Franklin injector, an automatic stoker, Gould regulator, and Westinghouse 6ET air brakes. Originally numbered パシ901–パシ918, they were the most American in appearance due to the arrangement of their running boards, and, like American locomotives, had the driver on the left hand side; this proved unpopular with the local crews, as they were the only left-side-drive locomotives in Korea until the arrival of the USATC S160 class after the end of the Pacific War. Despite this drawback, they were considered a success, and in 1923 six copies were delivered from Kisha Seizō. These moved the driver to the right side, and were originally numbered パシ919–パシ924. A year later, they swapped numbers with the Pashini class locomotives that had been delivered in 1923 before the Pashii copies, becoming パシ913–パシ918, and in Sentetsu's 1938 general renumbering, the eighteen locomotives were renumbered パシイ1–パシイ18.

Postwar
The exact dispersal of the Pashii-class locomotives between North and South after the partition of Korea is uncertain, but they were used by the KNR on passenger trains into the 1960s, while they lasted into the 1970s in KSR service, though little of their lives in the North is known.

Korean National Railroad 파시1 (Pasi1) class
At least ten served with the Korean National Railroad, where they were classified 파시1 (Pasi1). On 1 February 1954, 파시1-7 was pulling a 16-car passenger train southbound at Osan when it was destroyed in an accident. Running tender-ahead with no lights, it hit a South Korean Army lorry, which became wedged beneath the tender, derailing the locomotive and turning it around. The locomotive and three passenger cars were destroyed, and 57 people were killed. None of the KNR units were preserved.

Korean State Railway 바시하 (Pasiha) class
The number of Pashii-class locomotives taken over by the Korean State Railway is unknown, but they were initially designated 바시하 (Pasiha) class; they were later renumbered with a four-digit serial number, but details are unknown. The service lives and subsequent fate of the Pashii-class engines that operated in the North is likewise unknown.

Construction

References

Locomotives of Korea
Locomotives of South Korea
Locomotives of North Korea
Railway locomotives introduced in 1921
Railway locomotives introduced in 1923
4-6-2 locomotives
Baldwin locomotives
Kisha Seizo locomotives